Diheteropogon is a genus of African plants in the grass family.

 Species
 Diheteropogon amplectens (Nees) Clayton - from Mauritania to Tanzania + KwaZulu-Natal; also Madagascar
 Diheteropogon filifolius (Nees) Clayton - from Nigeria to Tanzania + KwaZulu-Natal
 Diheteropogon hagerupii Hitchc.  - from Mauritania to Chad + Cameroon
 Diheteropogon microterus Clayton - Zambia

References

External links
 Grassbase - The World Online Grass Flora

Andropogoneae
Poaceae genera
Flora of Africa
Taxa named by Eduard Hackel